Gaeiras is a civil parish in the municipality of Óbidos, Portugal. The population in 2011 was 2,331, in an area of 10.31 km2.

References

Freguesias of Óbidos, Portugal